Gemas (Negeri Sembilan Malay: Gomeh) is a small town and a mukim in Tampin District, Negeri Sembilan, Malaysia, near the Negeri Sembilan-Johor state border. It is situated 101 km northeast of Seremban, the state capital city, and 30 km north of Segamat, Johor.

Gemas is notable for being at the railway junction between the Malaysian west and east coast rail lines. For this reason, Gemas is busy for a town of its size.

Gemas is accessible via train from Singapore and Kuala Lumpur.
The whole town of Gemas stretches from Negeri Sembilan, crossing into the border with Johor. The Johorean side of Gemas is known as Gemas Baharu, in Segamat District, which is located about 1 km from Gemas town centre, implying that the original Gemas town centre is on the Negeri Sembilanese side.

To the southwest stands the famed Mount Ledang, also known as Mount Ophir, with a height of 1276 m.

Demographics 
Malays make up the majority of the population at 83% followed by the Chinese 8%, Indians at 5% and others 4%.

Education

Primary school 

 SK Gemas 
 SK Tuanku Abdul Rahman
 SJK(C) Kg. Baru Gemas
 SRJK(C) Kuo Min
 SJK(T) Gemas
 SK Kampong Ladang
 SK Londah

Secondary school 

 SMK Tuanku Abdul Rahman
 SMK Gemas
 SM Agama Gemas

Transportation

Rail
Gemas is located at the intersection of the West Coast and East Coast routes of the Keretapi Tanah Melayu (KTM) rail network. Trains from all directions stop at Gemas railway station, making it an important railway hub.

Gemas also marks the southern end of the electrified and double-track section of the West Coast Line. The electrification and double-tracking works were completed in 2013. The electric train services KTM Komuter and ETS services were extended to Gemas in October 2015, increasing services and cutting down travel time to Kuala Lumpur and other northern West Coast destinations.

Road
Gemas is connected to other towns by federal highways Federal Route 1 and Federal Route 10. Federal Route 1 links Gemas with Seremban, the capital of Negeri Sembilan as well as Tampin and all the way to Johor Bahru.

Federal Route 10 links Gemas to Temerloh in Pahang. This road is built almost parallel to the KTM East Coast Line tracks, passing through Bahau and Triang, two important railway towns.

Gemencheh Bridge during Battle of Malaya

During the Battle of Malaya in the Second World War, Gemencheh Bridge near Gemas was the site of a fierce battle between the Imperial Japanese Army and the 2/30th Battalion, 8th Division, Australian Imperial Force (AIF). Commanding Officer of the Battalion was Lieutenant Colonel Frederick "Black Jack" Galleghan. Gemencheh Bridge was a bridge over the Kelamah River (Sungai Kelamah in Malay) that connected Gemas with the larger neighbouring town of Tampin. The Japanese had passed through Tampin and needed to cross the bridge to reach Gemas.

On 14 January 1942, "B" Company of the 2/30th Battalion, launched an ambush against the Japanese in the hope of preventing them from advancing further south. As the advancing Japanese soldiers passed by the ambush site, the bridge was blown. The battle following the ambush, and a further battle closer to Gemas, lasted two days. It ended with the Australian withdrawal through Gemas to Fort Rose Estate.

Four days later, another encounter between Japanese and Allied soldiers took place near Parit Sulong during the Battle of Malaya. Allied troops, including the Australian 2/19th and 2/29th Battalions, were surrounded and routed there.

A memorial remembering fallen Australians now stands by the site of the destroyed Gemencheh Bridge in Federal Route 1.

Recently, a documentary titled The Battle of Gemas was jointly undertaken by Tahan Rata Filem and AVI to expand on the importance of this battle in the context of the Battle of Malaya and the fall of Singapore.

Politics
Gemas forms its own electoral district in the Negeri Sembilan State Legislative Assembly. The seat is currently chaired by Abdul Razak Bin Ab Said of UMNO/BN.

On the national level, Gemas is part of Tampin constituency of the Malaysian Parliament, currently represented by Hasan Baharom, from Parti Amanah Negara, part of the federal ruling coalition Pakatan Harapan.

Since 1988 Gemas is also an autonomous sub-district (daerah kecil), consisting of the Adat Perpatih customary districts of Gemas and Air Kuning. Municipal works and parliamentary representation still remain under Tampin. To date Gemas is the only autonomous sub-district in the state.

See also 
 Gemencheh
 Parit Sulong
 Gemas Baharu

References

External links

World War II sites in British Malaya
Towns in Negeri Sembilan
Mukims of Negeri Sembilan
Tampin District